Zacharias Charalambous (born March 25, 1971) is a former international Cypriot football defender.

He started his career in 1986 from Digenis Akritas Ypsonas. In 1992, he went to Anorthosis Famagusta and spent his career mainly in Anorthosis Famagusta where he played for nine years. Then, he joined APOEL for four years, where he ended his career in 2005.

External links
 

1971 births
Living people
APOEL FC players
Anorthosis Famagusta F.C. players
Cypriot footballers
Cyprus international footballers
Greek Cypriot people
Association football defenders
People from Famagusta